Beaumont-de-Pertuis (literally Beaumont of Pertuis) is a commune in the Vaucluse department in the Provence-Alpes-Côte d'Azur region in southeastern France.

Beaumont de Pertuis is a small village situated in the Parc Naturel du Luberon on the border of the Alpes de Haute Provence, the Var and the Bouches du Rhone. A busy road once ran through the middle of Beaumont de Pertuis which was at the time a prosperous medieval market town. In the 14th century, Beaumont could boast more than 1,000 inhabitants and belonged to one of the largest communes in France.

The first reference to Beaumont (Baùmoun, which means "cave" in Provençal dialect) dates back to 1079, a reference to the cave of Eucherius of Lyon. Before becoming archbishop this hermit went on retreat in a cave overhanging la Durance in the town of Beaumont de Pertuis. Later on, this cave became a pilgrimage site and a chapel was carved inside the mountain.

Landmarks 
Saint Jean Baptiste Church
Place de la Colonne
Sainte Croix Chapel
Notre Dame de Beauvoir Chapel
Site of former castle
Eucherius of Lyon Chapel

See also
 Côtes du Luberon AOC
 Communes of the Vaucluse department
 Luberon

References

Communes of Vaucluse